The Universitetsky Constituency (No.201) was a Russian legislative constituency in Moscow in 1993-2007. It was based in South-Western and Western Moscow. In 2016 reconfiguration the constituency was partitioned between Kuntsevo, New Moscow and Cheryomushki constituencies.

Members elected

Election results

1993

|-
! colspan=2 style="background-color:#E9E9E9;text-align:left;vertical-align:top;" |Candidate
! style="background-color:#E9E9E9;text-align:left;vertical-align:top;" |Party
! style="background-color:#E9E9E9;text-align:right;" |Votes
! style="background-color:#E9E9E9;text-align:right;" |%
|-
|style="background-color:#E9E26E"|
|align=left|Aleksandr Braginsky
|align=left|Russian Democratic Reform Movement
|50,901
|21.90%
|-
|style="background-color:"|
|align=left|Aleksandr Lukin
|align=left|Independent
| -
|10.45%
|-
| colspan="5" style="background-color:#E9E9E9;"|
|- style="font-weight:bold"
| colspan="3" style="text-align:left;" | Total
| 232,462
| 100%
|-
| colspan="5" style="background-color:#E9E9E9;"|
|- style="font-weight:bold"
| colspan="4" |Source:
|
|}

1995

|-
! colspan=2 style="background-color:#E9E9E9;text-align:left;vertical-align:top;" |Candidate
! style="background-color:#E9E9E9;text-align:left;vertical-align:top;" |Party
! style="background-color:#E9E9E9;text-align:right;" |Votes
! style="background-color:#E9E9E9;text-align:right;" |%
|-
|style="background-color:"|
|align=left|Pavel Bunich
|align=left|Independent
|56,056
|18.49%
|-
|style="background-color:"|
|align=left|Aleksandr Lukin
|align=left|Yabloko
|43,067
|14.21%
|-
|style="background-color:"|
|align=left|Viktor Shevelukha
|align=left|Communist Party
|36,831
|12.15%
|-
|style="background-color:"|
|align=left|Artyom Tarasov
|align=left|Environmental Party of Russia "Kedr"
|34,427
|11.36%
|-
|style="background-color:#3A46CE"|
|align=left|Nikolay Vorontsov
|align=left|Democratic Choice of Russia – United Democrats
|28,627
|9.44%
|-
|style="background-color:"|
|align=left|Grigory Beryozkin
|align=left|Independent
|23,994
|7.92%
|-
|style="background-color:"|
|align=left|Yury Kochanov
|align=left|Independent
|7,923
|2.61%
|-
|style="background-color:"|
|align=left|Gennady Venglinsky
|align=left|Independent
|7,339
|2.42%
|-
|style="background-color:"|
|align=left|Natalia Narochnitskaya
|align=left|Zemsky Sobor
|5,946
|1.96%
|-
|style="background-color:"|
|align=left|Vadim Modenov
|align=left|Independent
|5,461
|1.80%
|-
|style="background-color:"|
|align=left|Vladimir Aleksandrov
|align=left|Liberal Democratic Party
|4,645
|1.53%
|-
|style="background-color:"|
|align=left|Anatoly Medvedev
|align=left|Independent
|3,740
|1.23%
|-
|style="background-color:"|
|align=left|Sergey Kostenko
|align=left|Independent
|3,135
|1.03%
|-
|style="background-color:"|
|align=left|Valery Zhukov
|align=left|Independent
|2,281
|0.75%
|-
|style="background-color:#265BAB"|
|align=left|Valery Lashkov
|align=left|Russian Lawyers' Association
|2,163
|0.71%
|-
|style="background-color:"|
|align=left|Yury Kapralny
|align=left|Independent
|1,856
|0.61%
|-
|style="background-color:"|
|align=left|Nadezhda Belostotskaya
|align=left|Independent
|1,372
|0.45%
|-
|style="background-color:#000000"|
|colspan=2 |against all
|28,513
|9.41%
|-
| colspan="5" style="background-color:#E9E9E9;"|
|- style="font-weight:bold"
| colspan="3" style="text-align:left;" | Total
| 303,099
| 100%
|-
| colspan="5" style="background-color:#E9E9E9;"|
|- style="font-weight:bold"
| colspan="4" |Source:
|
|}

1999

|-
! colspan=2 style="background-color:#E9E9E9;text-align:left;vertical-align:top;" |Candidate
! style="background-color:#E9E9E9;text-align:left;vertical-align:top;" |Party
! style="background-color:#E9E9E9;text-align:right;" |Votes
! style="background-color:#E9E9E9;text-align:right;" |%
|-
|style="background-color:"|
|align=left|Mikhail Zadornov
|align=left|Yabloko
|64,179
|20.16%
|-
|style="background-color:"|
|align=left|Oleg Petrov
|align=left|Independent
|58,456
|18.36%
|-
|style="background-color:#1042A5"|
|align=left|Maria Arbatova
|align=left|Union of Right Forces
|47,052
|14.78%
|-
|style="background-color:"|
|align=left|Aleksandr Kuvayev
|align=left|Communist Party
|39,863
|12.52%
|-
|style="background-color:"|
|align=left|Leonid Olshansky
|align=left|Independent
|22,516
|7.07%
|-
|style="background-color:#23238E"|
|align=left|Pavel Bunich (incumbent)
|align=left|Our Home – Russia
|19,289
|6.06%
|-
|style="background-color:"|
|align=left|Vladimir Kishinets
|align=left|Independent
|9,178
|2.88%
|-
|style="background-color:"|
|align=left|Vladimir Semago
|align=left|Independent
|4,733
|1.49%
|-
|style="background-color:"|
|align=left|Darya Aslamova
|align=left|Independent
|4,659
|1.46%
|-
|style="background-color:"|
|align=left|Aleksandr Ivanov
|align=left|Independent
|1,613
|0.51%
|-
|style="background-color:"|
|align=left|Aleksey Churkin
|align=left|Independent
|1,049
|0.33%
|-
|style="background-color:#000000"|
|colspan=2 |against all
|37,739
|11.85%
|-
| colspan="5" style="background-color:#E9E9E9;"|
|- style="font-weight:bold"
| colspan="3" style="text-align:left;" | Total
| 318,367
| 100%
|-
| colspan="5" style="background-color:#E9E9E9;"|
|- style="font-weight:bold"
| colspan="4" |Source:
|
|}

2003

|-
! colspan=2 style="background-color:#E9E9E9;text-align:left;vertical-align:top;" |Candidate
! style="background-color:#E9E9E9;text-align:left;vertical-align:top;" |Party
! style="background-color:#E9E9E9;text-align:right;" |Votes
! style="background-color:#E9E9E9;text-align:right;" |%
|-
|style="background-color:"|
|align=left|Mikhail Zadornov (incumbent)
|align=left|Yabloko
|70,232
|26.55%
|-
|style="background-color:"|
|align=left|Yevgeny Gerasimov
|align=left|United Russia
|67,265
|25.43%
|-
|style="background-color:"|
|align=left|Nikolay Gubenko
|align=left|Communist Party
|42,460
|16.05%
|-
|style="background-color:"|
|align=left|Vladimir Sukhomlin
|align=left|Independent
|11,364
|4.30%
|-
|style="background-color:"|
|align=left|Andrey Parshev
|align=left|Independent
|8,438
|3.19%
|-
|style="background-color:#DBB726"|
|align=left|Irina Bogdanova
|align=left|Democratic Party
|6,306
|2.38%
|-
|style="background-color: #00A1FF"|
|align=left|Svyatoslav Rybas
|align=left|Party of Russia's Rebirth-Russian Party of Life
|2,252
|0.85%
|-
|style="background-color:#14589F"|
|align=left|Ruslan Sakiyev
|align=left|Development of Enterprise
|1,965
|0.74%
|-
|style="background-color:"|
|align=left|Olga Skorogodskikh
|align=left|Independent
|1,837
|0.68%
|-
|style="background-color:"|
|align=left|Svetlana Potapova
|align=left|Social Democratic Party
|1,804
|0.68%
|-
|style="background-color:"|
|align=left|Vyacheslav Lovtsov
|align=left|Independent
|1,263
|0.48%
|-
|style="background-color:"|
|align=left|Vladimir Didenko
|align=left|Independent
|1,107
|0.42%
|-
|style="background-color:"|
|align=left|Nikolay Khramov
|align=left|Independent
|1,095
|0.41%
|-
|style="background-color:#000000"|
|colspan=2 |against all
|42,614
|16.11%
|-
| colspan="5" style="background-color:#E9E9E9;"|
|- style="font-weight:bold"
| colspan="3" style="text-align:left;" | Total
| 265,577
| 100%
|-
| colspan="5" style="background-color:#E9E9E9;"|
|- style="font-weight:bold"
| colspan="4" |Source:
|
|}

2005

|-
! colspan=2 style="background-color:#E9E9E9;text-align:left;vertical-align:top;" |Candidate
! style="background-color:#E9E9E9;text-align:left;vertical-align:top;" |Party
! style="background-color:#E9E9E9;text-align:right;" |Votes
! style="background-color:#E9E9E9;text-align:right;" |%
|-
|style="background-color:"|
|align=left|Stanislav Govorukhin
|align=left|United Russia
|59,293
|38.16%
|-
|style="background-color:"|
|align=left|Viktor Shenderovich
|align=left|Independent
|26,157
|16.83%
|-
|style="background-color:"|
|align=left|Mikhail Dvornikov
|align=left|Independent
|11,882
|7.64%
|-
|style="background-color:"|
|align=left|Sergey Danilenko
|align=left|Rodina
|10,780
|6.93%
|-
|style="background-color:"|
|align=left|Stella Obodina
|align=left|Independent
|5,695
|3.66%
|-
|style="background-color:"|
|align=left|Nikolay Zhdanov-Lutsenko
|align=left|Independent
|5,520
|3.55%
|-
|style="background-color:"|
|align=left|Dmitry Gudkov
|align=left|Independent
|2,739
|1.76%
|-
|style="background-color:"|
|align=left|Vladimir Malakhov
|align=left|Independent
|2,245
|1.44%
|-
|style="background-color:"|
|align=left|Anna Kameneva
|align=left|Independent
|2,191
|1.41%
|-
|style="background-color:"|
|align=left|Sergey Slabun
|align=left|Independent
|1,731
|1.11%
|-
|style="background-color:"|
|align=left|Raisa Babich
|align=left|Independent
|1,274
|0.82%
|-
|style="background-color:"|
|align=left|Valery Kubarev
|align=left|Independent
|746
|0.48%
|-
|style="background-color:#000000"|
|colspan=2 |against all
|19,900
|12.81%
|-
| colspan="5" style="background-color:#E9E9E9;"|
|- style="font-weight:bold"
| colspan="3" style="text-align:left;" | Total
| 155,343
| 100%
|-
| colspan="5" style="background-color:#E9E9E9;"|
|- style="font-weight:bold"
| colspan="4" |Source:
|
|}

Notes

References

Obsolete Russian legislative constituencies
Politics of Moscow